Caleb Ariaka Mawa Nguma was an Anglican bishop in Uganda:  He became Bishop of Madi-West Nile in 1990 and served until his death four years later.

References

Anglican bishops of Madi and West Nile
Uganda Christian University alumni
20th-century Anglican bishops in Uganda
1994 deaths